Gmina Borzechów is a rural gmina (administrative district) in Lublin County, Lublin Voivodeship, in eastern Poland.

Villages
Gmina Borzechów contains the villages and settlements of Białawoda, Borzechów, Borzechów-Kolonia, Dąbrowa, Dobrowola, Grabówka, Kaźmierów, Kępa, Kępa Borzechowska, Kępa-Kolonia, Kłodnica Dolna, Kłodnica Górna, Kolonia Łopiennik, Łączki-Pawłówek, Łopiennik, Ludwinów, Majdan Borzechowski, Majdan Radliński, Majdan Skrzyniecki, Osina, Ryczydół and Zakącie.

Neighbouring gminas
Gmina Borzechów is bordered by the gminas of Bełżyce, Chodel, Niedrzwica Duża, Urzędów and Wilkołaz.

References

Borzechow
Lublin County